Primo may refer to:

People
DJ Premier (born 1966), hip-hop producer, sometimes goes by nickname Primo
Primo Carnera (1906–1967), Italian boxer, World Heavyweight champion 1933–1934
Primo Cassarino (born 1956), enforcer for the Gambino crime family
Primo Colón (born 1982), ring name of professional wrestler Eddie Colón, multiple tag team champion in the WWE
Primo Conti (1900–1988), Italian Futurist artist
Primo Levi (1919–1987), Jewish Italian chemist, Holocaust survivor, and author
Primo Miller (1915–1999), American football player
Primo Riccitelli (1880–1941), Italian composer
Primo Zamparini (born 1939), Italian bantamweight Olympic and professional boxer
Primo Brown (1976–2016), Italian rapper
Primož Brezec (born 1979), Slovenian professional basketball player
Al Primo (1938–2022), American television news executive credited with creating the Eyewitness News format
Giancarlo Primo (1924–2005), Italian basketball player and coach
Joshua Primo (born 2002), Canadian basketball player
Francisco Primo de Verdad y Ramos (1760–1808), New Spain lawyer and politician
The Italian name of Saint Primus

Places in Italy
Casorate Primo, a municipality in the Province of Pavia in Lombardy
Castano Primo, a municipality in the Province of Milan in Lombardy
Masciago Primo, a municipality in the Province of Varese in Lombardy
Palasport Primo Carnera, an indoor sporting arena in Udine

Art, music, and literature
 Primo, sitting on the right side of the secondo in music for piano four hands
Primo!, an Australian band
Primo (film), a 2005 film of Antony Sher's play of the same title, adapted from Primo Levi's Holocaust memoir If This Is a Man
An alternate term for the subidor, a drum used in the music of Puerto Rico
Primo (album), an album released in 1990 by Rifle Sport on Ruthless Records
 Primo, a 1991 album by Dr. Feelgood
Primo (Yu-Gi-Oh! 5D's), a character in Yu-Gi-Oh! 5D's

Business and industry

Primo Brewing & Malting Company, based in Honolulu, Hawaii
Primo Filmes, a Brazilian film production company

Primo Schincariol, a South American brewery and beverage maker based in Brazil
Primo smallgoods, a Sydney-based company, the largest producer of ham, bacon and small goods in the Southern Hemisphere
Primo Water, an American-Canadian water company
PRIMOS, an operating system developed during the 1970s by Prime Computer
DUPLO Primo and Lego Primo, now known as Lego Baby, a line of Lego blocks for small children
Plaxton Primo, a type of small bus produced by Plaxton
Primo Lenses, a lenses brand-line manufactured by Panavision Inc

Other
Primo TV, an American English-language television channel for Latino children
Primos (SEPTA station), a rail station in Upper Derby Township, Pennsylvania
Primo, in Italian meal structure, the first course
"Primo", a contraction of Primobolan, a brand name for metenolone

See also
Primo de Rivera
Primo amore (disambiguation)